Mpox (formerly known as monkeypox) is an infectious viral disease that can occur in humans and some other animals. Symptoms include fever, swollen lymph nodes, and a rash that forms blisters and then crusts over. The time from exposure to onset of symptoms ranges from five to twenty-one days. The duration of symptoms is typically two to four weeks. There may be mild symptoms, and it may occur without any symptoms being apparent. The classic presentation of fever and muscle pains, followed by swollen glands, with lesions all at the same stage, has not been found to be common to all outbreaks. Cases may be severe, especially in children, pregnant women or people with suppressed immune systems.

The disease is caused by the monkeypox virus, a zoonotic virus in the genus Orthopoxvirus. The variola virus, the causative agent of smallpox, is also in this genus. Of the two types, called "clades" in humans, CladeII (formerly West African clade) causes a less severe disease than the Central African (Congo basin) type. It may spread from infected animals by handling infected meat or via bites or scratches. Human-to-human transmission can occur through exposure to infected body fluids or contaminated objects, by small droplets, and possibly through the airborne route. People can spread the virus from the onset of symptoms until all the lesions have scabbed and fallen off; with some evidence of spread for more than a week after lesions have crusted. Diagnosis can be confirmed by testing a lesion for the virus's DNA.

There is no known cure. A study in 1988 found that the smallpox vaccine was around 85% protective in preventing infection in close contacts and in lessening the severity of the disease. A newer smallpox and mpox vaccine based on modified vaccinia Ankara has been approved, but with limited availability. Other measures include regular hand washing and avoiding sick people and animals. Antiviral drugs, cidofovir and tecovirimat, vaccinia immune globulin and the smallpox vaccine may be used during outbreaks. The illness is usually mild and most of those infected will recover within a few weeks without treatment. Estimates of the risk of death vary from 1% to 10%, although few deaths as a consequence of mpox have been recorded since 2017.

Several species of mammals are suspected to act as a natural reservoir of the virus. Although it was once thought to be uncommon in humans, the quantity and severity of outbreaks has significantly increased since the 1980s, possibly as a result of waning immunity since the stopping of routine smallpox vaccination. The first cases in humans were found in 1970 in the Democratic Republic of the Congo (DRC). There have been sporadic cases in Central and West Africa, and it is endemic in the DRC. The 2022 mpox outbreak represents the first incidence of widespread community transmission outside of Africa, which was initially identified in the United Kingdom in May 2022, with subsequent cases confirmed in at least 74 countries in all continents except Antarctica. On 23 July 2022, the World Health Organization (WHO) declared the outbreak a Public Health Emergency of International Concern (PHEIC). , there have been with more than 86,000 reported cases in 110 countries and territories.

Nomenclature 
On 28 November 2022, the World Health Organization announced it "will adopt the term mpox in its communications, and encourages others to follow these recommendations". The name monkeypox was criticised for being a misnomer (monkeys are not the main host or reservoir of the virus), for reinforcing stigma about African countries as a source of disease, and encouraging racist stereotypes that compared Black people with primates. The change followed an open letter, by two dozen African scientists, warning that these issues were harming the fight to contain the disease outbreak.

Signs and symptoms

It is possible for a person to be infected with monkeypox virus without showing any symptoms. Mpox symptoms tend to begin 5 to 21 days after infection, with early symptoms including headache, muscle pains, fever and fatigue, initially resembling influenza. Within a few days of the fever, lesions characteristically appear on the face before appearing on the trunk then elsewhere such as palms of the hands and soles of the feet. The disease can resemble chickenpox, measles and smallpox but is distinguished by the presence of swollen glands which may appear behind the ear, below the jaw, in the neck or in the groin, before the onset of the rash. Many cases in the 2022 mpox outbreak presented with genital and peri-anal lesions, fever, swollen lymph nodes, and pain when swallowing, with some patients manifesting only single sores from the disease.

Three-quarters of affected people have lesions on the palms and soles, more than two-thirds in the mouth, a third on the genitals and one in five have lesions in the eyes. They begin as small flat spots, before becoming small bumps which then fill with at first clear fluid and then yellow fluid, which subsequently burst and scab over, persisting for around ten days. There may be a few lesions or several thousand, sometimes merging to produce large lesions. After healing, the lesions may leave pale marks before becoming dark scars.

An unwell person may remain so for two to four weeks.

Complications
Complications include secondary infections, pneumonia, sepsis, encephalitis, and loss of vision with severe eye infection. If infection occurs during pregnancy, still birth or birth defects may occur. The disease may be milder in people vaccinated against smallpox in childhood. Patel and colleagues, in The BMJ, demonstrate that this virus can produce severe symptoms, particularly in HIV-positive people. The descriptive case series reveal that symptoms can be so severe that hospitalization is required in 10% of cases. The study also shows that 75% of patients (15 out of 20 participants) admitted to the hospital were HIV-positive individuals. Overall, the study depict a new variety of clinical manifestations including proctitis and rectal perforation. The pictures of genital lesions published in The BMJ show the severity of mpox, which is often described as causing moderate symptoms.

In other animals
The disease has also been reported in dormice, tree squirrels, rope squirrels and non human primates. Rodents such as rats and mice are likely susceptible but not known.
Signs and symptoms in animals vary among different species. Monkeypox virus infected Gambian pouched rats may have mild symptoms. During the 2003 US outbreak, affected prairie dogs presented with fever, cough, sore eyes, poor feeding and rash. Non-human primates present similarly. They may have breathing problems, facial swelling, mouth ulcers and swollen glands. In cynomolgus monkeys, the time from exposure to symptoms was noted to be around a week. Rabbits and rodents typically present with fever, cough, runny nose, sore eyes and swollen glands. They develop small bumps that fill with yellow fluid and may have patches of hair loss and pneumonia.
Spread among animals occurs via the fecal-oral route and through the nose, through wounds and eating infected meat. Death is more likely in baby monkeys. The CDC recommend that animals exposed to monkeypox virus be quarantined for six weeks.

Causes
Mpox in both humans and animals is caused by infection with the monkeypox virus – a double-stranded DNA virus in the genus Orthopoxvirus, family Poxviridae. The virus was first identified in captive monkeys and is found mainly in tropical rainforest regions of Central and West Africa. The two subtypes of virus are CladeI and CladeII (formerly Congo Basin and West African clades respectively, matching the geographical areas).

In addition to monkeys, the virus has been identified in Gambian pouched rats (Cricetomys gambianus), dormice (Graphiurus spp.) and African squirrels (Heliosciurus, and Funisciurus). The use of these animals as food may be an important source of transmission to humans.

Transmission
Humans can be infected by an animal via a bite or scratch, bush meat preparation, or by contact with an infected animal's bodily fluids or lesion material. The virus is thought to enter the body through broken skin, the respiratory tract, or the mucous membranes of the eyes, nose, or mouth.

Once a human is infected, transmission to other humans is common, with family members and hospital staff at particularly high risk of infection. The virus can spread by respiratory (airborne) contact or by direct contact with an infected person's bodily fluids or during pregnancy from mother to fetus. There are indications that transmission can occur during sexual contact, with infectious monkeypox virus able to be isolated from semen samples. Prolonged shedding in seminal fluids has raised the possibility of a genital reservoir for monkeypox virus. It is not known if the virus can spread through vaginal fluids.

The virus can also spread via fomites or through indirect contact with lesion material, such as through contaminated bedding, even with standard personal protective equipment, likely through inhalation. Risk factors for transmission include sharing a bed or room, or using the same utensils as an infected person. Increased transmission risk is associated with factors involving the introduction of virus to the oral mucosa. It is not yet known if people without symptoms of mpox can spread the virus.

Further research about the transmission of the strain responsible for the 2022 outbreak is ongoing, but it is not thought to be different from other strains of the cladeII.

People living with HIV 
According to a Centers for Disease Control and Prevention (CDC) report, 41% of cases of mpox were among HIV-positive patients (136 out of 334 patients) between May and July 2022. The New England Journal of Medicine (NEJM) also looked at more than 500 cases from different countries and found that 41% of them were among HIV patients. In addition, a study that looked at nearly 200 cases in Barcelona and Madrid discovered that 40% were HIV-positive. Patel and colleagues observed 197 patients from sexual health centres in south London between May and July 2022. They reported 35.5% patients had HIV-1 co-infection. 91.4% of these participants were receiving antiretroviral therapy and 78.6% had an undetectable HIV-1 viral load (<200 copies). The median CD4 count was 664 cells (interquartile range 522-894 cells). The proportion of HIV-positive individuals in these reports is significantly higher than the HIV rate among men who have sex with other men.

Diagnosis

Clinical differential diagnosis must consider other rash illnesses, such as chickenpox, measles, bacterial skin infections, scabies, syphilis and medication-associated allergies. Lymphadenopathy during the prodromal stage of illness can distinguish mpox from chickenpox or smallpox. Diagnosis can be verified by testing for the virus.

Polymerase chain reaction (PCR) testing of samples from skin lesions is the preferred laboratory test. PCR blood tests are usually inconclusive because the virus remains in blood only a short time. To interpret test results, information is required on date of onset of fever, date of onset of rash, date of specimen collection, current stage of rash, and patient age.

Prevention
Vaccination against smallpox is assumed to protect against human mpox because they are closely related viruses, and the vaccine protects animals from experimental lethal monkeypox virus challenges. This has not been conclusively demonstrated in humans because routine smallpox vaccination was discontinued following the eradication of smallpox.

Smallpox vaccine has been reported to reduce the risk of mpox among previously vaccinated persons in Africa. The decrease in immunity to poxviruses in exposed populations is a factor in the prevalence of mpox. It is attributed to waning cross-protective immunity among those vaccinated before 1980, when mass smallpox vaccinations were discontinued, and to the gradually increasing proportion of unvaccinated individuals.

The United States Centers for Disease Control and Prevention (CDC) recommends that persons investigating mpox outbreaks and involved in caring for infected individuals or animals should receive a smallpox vaccination to protect against mpox. Persons who have had close or intimate contact with individuals or animals confirmed to have mpox should also be vaccinated. However, the CDC does not recommend pre-exposure vaccination for unexposed veterinarians, veterinary staff, or animal control officers, unless such persons are involved in field investigations. No smallpox or mpox vaccine has been approved for use during pregnancy. The CDC recommends that healthcare providers don a full set of personal protective equipment (PPE) before caring for an infected person. This includes a gown, mask, goggles, and a disposable filtering respirator (such as an N95). An infected person should be isolated in preferably a negative air pressure room or at least a private exam room to keep others from possible contact.

Mpox prevention cannot be simplified to just providing a vaccine. There are more pressing challenges to address, such as access to treatment, veracity and availability of information, and quality of health care. Public health messaging is perhaps the most important challenge. The multiple levels of interconnectivity and negotiated social meanings inherent to the disease require cooperation between medical professionals and patients to achieve correct public health communication. Therefore, the University of London lecturer Marco Scalvini argues in The BMJ that it is necessary to establish a "new ethic of shared responsibility" to educate people about dangers and give people from underprivileged groups the tools they need to make better decisions.

Treatment
In the European Union and the United States, tecovirimat is approved for the treatment of several poxvirus infections, including mpox. BMJ Best Practice recommends tecovirimat or the smallpox treatment brincidofovir as the first line antiviral treatment if required, alongside supportive care (including antipyretic, fluid balance and oxygenation). Empirical antibiotic therapy or aciclovir may be used if secondary bacterial or varicella zoster infection is suspected, respectively.

Outcome
After healing, the scabs may leave pale marks before becoming darker scars. The risk of death in those infected ranges from 0% to 11%, depending on the type of monkeypox virus and location in the world. Fatality rates have been reported as around 3.6% in West Africa and 10.6% in Central Africa. Most reported deaths have occurred in young children and people with HIV infection.

Epidemiology

In 1970, monkeypox virus was first associated with an illness as a disease in humans in the Democratic Republic of the Congo (formerly Zaire), in the town of Basankusu, Équateur Province.
Although it was once thought to be uncommon in humans, cases increased since the 1980s, possibly as a result of waning immunity since the stopping of routine smallpox vaccination.

Between 1981 and 1986 WHO surveillance in DRC/Zaire recorded 338 confirmed cases and 33 deaths (CFR 9.8%). In 1996–1997, a second outbreak of human illness was identified in DRC/Zaire and between 1991 and 1999, 511 cases were reported in DRC/Zaire. CladeI of disease remains endemic in DRC and has a higher CFR than the other genetic clade in Western Africa.

No human-to-human transmission was documented until the 2022 mpox outbreak in Europe. CladeII had an outbreak – the first outbreak of mpox outside Africa – in Midwestern United States among owners of pet prairie dogs in 2003. Seventy-one people were reportedly infected, of whom none died.

As of 2018, mpox was traditionally restricted to the ecology of tropical rainforests. although the pattern was broken in 2005, when 49 cases were reported in Sudan (areas now South Sudan), with no fatalities. The genetic analysis suggested that the virus did not originate in Sudan but was imported, most likely from DRC.

Many more mpox cases have been reported in Central and West Africa, and in the Democratic Republic of Congo in particular: 2000 cases per year are known between 2011 and 2014. The collected data is often incomplete and unconfirmed, which hinders realistic estimations of the number of cases of mpox over time. Nevertheless, it was suggested that the number of reported mpox cases had increased and the geographical occurrence broadened as of 2018.

2003 U.S. outbreak
 

In May 2003, a young child became ill with fever and rash after being bitten by a prairie dog purchased at a local swap meet near Milwaukee, Wisconsin. In total, 71 cases of mpox were reported through 20 June 2003. All cases were traced to Gambian pouched rats imported from Accra, Ghana, in April 2003 by a Texas exotic animal distributor. No deaths resulted. Electron microscopy and serologic studies were used to confirm that the disease was human mpox.

People with mpox typically experienced prodromal symptoms of fever, headaches, muscle aches, chills, and drenching sweats. Roughly one-third of infected people had nonproductive coughs. This prodromal phase was followed 1–10 days later by the development of a papular rash that typically progressed through stages of vesiculation, pustulation, umbilication, and crusting. In some people, early lesions had become ulcerated.

Rash distribution and lesions occurred on head, trunk, and extremities. Many of the people had initial and satellite lesions on palms, soles, and extremities. Rashes were generalized in some people. After onset of the rash, people generally manifested rash lesions in different stages. Everyone affected reported direct or close contact with prairie dogs, later found to be infected with the monkeypox virus.

2017–2019 Nigeria outbreak

According to the Nigeria Centre for Disease Control (NCDC), between 1971 and 1978, only 10 human mpox infections were reported in the country.

In September 2017, monkeypox virus infecting humans re-emerged in Nigeria, 39 years since it had been last reported. The subsequent 2017–18 Nigerian human mpox outbreak was, at that time, the largest ever outbreak of cladeII of the virus, with 118 confirmed cases. Unlike previous outbreaks of this clade, infection was predominantly among young male adults and human-to-human transmission appears to have readily occurred. Seven deaths (5 male, 2 female, case fatality rate of 6%) were reported, including a baby and four HIV/AIDS patients. Additionally, a pregnant woman in her second trimester had a spontaneous miscarriage due to monkeypox virus infection.

The Niger Delta University Teaching Hospital reported that a substantial number of its young adult cases had concomitant genital ulcers, syphilis and HIV infection.
Mpox spread around southeast and south Nigeria with some states and the federal government of Nigeria seeking ways to contain it. By December 2017 it spread to Akwa Ibom, Abia, Bayelsa, Benue, Cross River, Delta, Edo, Ekiti, Enugu, Imo, Lagos, Nasarawa, Oyo, Plateau, Rivers and Federal Capital Territory. The outbreak started in September 2017 and remained ongoing across multiple states as of May 2019.

The US Centers for Disease Control and Prevention reported cases of American travelers contracting mpox upon return from Lagos and Ibadan. Agam Rao, a medical officer in the Division of Pathogens and High Consequence Pathology at the CDC, said that since 2018 all cases reported outside Africa have come from Nigeria.

In a 2021 article Oyewale Tomori pointed out that the number of mpox cases in Nigeria through 2021 was likely to be under-represented, because much of the Nigerian population had been avoiding healthcare facilities due to fear of contracting COVID-19.

In May 2022, the Nigerian government released a report stating that between 2017 and 2022, 558 cases were confirmed across 32 states and the Federal Capital Territory. The Rivers State was the most affected by mpox followed by Bayelsa and Lagos. There were 8 deaths reported, making for a 3.5% Case Fatality Ratio. In 2022, NCDC implemented a National Technical Working Group for reporting and monitoring infections, strengthening response capacity.

2018 and 2019 United Kingdom cases
In September 2018, the United Kingdom's first case of mpox was recorded. The person, a Nigerian national, is believed to have contracted mpox in Nigeria before travelling to the United Kingdom. According to Public Health England, the person was staying in a naval base in Cornwall before being moved to the Royal Free Hospital's specialised infectious disease unit. People who had been in contact with the person since he contracted the disease were contacted.

A second case was confirmed in the town of Blackpool, with a further case that of a medical worker who cared for the case from Blackpool. A fourth case occurred on 3 December 2019, when mpox was diagnosed in a person in south west England. They were travelling to the UK from Nigeria.

2019 Singapore case
In May 2019, a 38-year-old man who travelled from Nigeria was hospitalised in an isolation ward at the National Centre for Infectious Diseases in Singapore, after being confirmed as the country's first case of mpox. As a result, 22 people were quarantined. The case may have been linked to a simultaneous outbreak in Nigeria.

2021 cases in United Kingdom, United States
In May 2021, in the UK, three cases of mpox from a single household were identified by Public Health Wales. The cases were also announced by Health Secretary Matt Hancock while addressing MPs. The index case was diagnosed on 24 May after traveling from Nigeria. The second case was reported on 2 June, and the third on 24 June. One of the three patients, an adult female, was treated with tecovirimat. On day 7 of tecovirimat, she was discharged from hospital to complete her second week of treatment at home.

In July 2021, in the US, an American returning from a trip in Nigeria was diagnosed with mpox. Subsequent testing identified the virus as belonging to cladeII. The patient was hospitalized and treated with tecovirimat and was discharged after 32 days, at which time monkeypox virus DNA could no longer be detected in residual skin lesions.

2022–2023 outbreak

An outbreak of mpox was confirmed in May 2022. The initial cluster of cases was found in the United Kingdom, where the first case was detected in London on 6 May 2022 in a patient with a recent travel history from Nigeria (where the disease is endemic). On 16 May, the UK Health Security Agency (UKHSA)  confirmed four new cases with no link to travel to a country where mpox is endemic. All four cases appeared to have been infected in London. From 18 May onwards, cases were reported from an increasing number of countries and regions, predominantly in Europe and in the Americas but also in Asia, in Africa, and in Oceania.

History 
Mpox was first identified as a distinct illness in 1958 among laboratory monkeys in Copenhagen, Denmark.
The first documented cases in humans was in 1970, in six unvaccinated children during the smallpox eradication efforts; the first being a 9-month old boy in the Democratic Republic of the Congo (formerly Zaire). The others, including three who were playmates, were in Liberia and Sierra Leone. It was noted to be less easily transmissible than smallpox. From 1981 to 1986, over 300 cases of human mpox were reported in the DRC, the majority being due to contact with animals. In 1996, the disease reemerged in the DRC with 88% of cases resulting from human-to-human transmission. Small viral outbreaks with a death rate in the range of 10% and a secondary human-to-human infection rate of about the same amount occur routinely in equatorial Central and West Africa. In humans, the disease remained confined to the rain forests of Western and Central Africa until 2003, when an outbreak of mpox occurred in the US. All cases were traced to sick rodents imported from Ghana. Local prairie dogs caught the infection and passed it onto their owners. The disease was found to be mild and there were no deaths. Between 1970 and 2019 the disease was reported in 10 African countries; mostly in Central and West Africa.

See also
 2003 Midwest monkeypox outbreak
 2022–2023 mpox outbreak
 2022–2023 mpox outbreak in Canada
 2022–2023 mpox outbreak in the United States
 2022–2023 mpox outbreak in the United Kingdom

Notes

References

External links 

 CDC – Mpox
 WHO – Monkeypox Fact Sheet
 "Could Monkeypox Take Over Where Smallpox Left Off?". Scientific American, 4 March 2013.
 MonkeypoxTracker – Monkeypox statistics visualization site
 PoxApp – the mpox app – Assesses skin lesions and symptoms with artificial intelligence developed by Stanford University

 
Animal viral diseases
Naming controversies
Poxviruses
2022 neologisms
Virus-related cutaneous conditions
Wikipedia medicine articles ready to translate